(Heart and mouth and deed and life), BWV 147.1, is a cantata by Johann Sebastian Bach. He composed it in Weimar in 1716 for the fourth Sunday in Advent, 20 December. It is uncertain if the work was performed then. He later expanded the work in 1723 as Herz und Mund und Tat und Leben, BWV 147.

History and text 
On 2 March 1714 Bach was appointed concertmaster of the Weimar court capelle of the co-reigning dukes Wilhelm Ernst and Ernst August of Saxe-Weimar. He likely wrote the work in 1716 for the fourth Sunday of Advent, although it may not have been performed at the time. The prescribed readings for the day were from the Epistle to the Philippians and the Gospel of John. The cantata uses a text by the court poet Salomo Franck, published in the cantata cycle Evangelische Sonn- und Fest-Tages-Andachten in 1717.

Bach's superior Drese had died on 1 December that year, and Bach seemed eager to show his capabilities by composing cantatas for three Sundays in succession, including this cantata. When he realized that not he but Drese's son would succeed as Kapellmeister, he stopped working on them. He broke up the autograph score after the first movement, and would not compose another cantata for Weimar.

Scoring and structure 
The work was scored for four solo voices (soprano, alto, tenor, and bass) and a four-part choir. As the music is now lost, the cantata's instrumentation is unclear, but was likely similar to BWV 147.
The piece has six movements:
 Chorus: 
 Aria: 
 Aria: 
 Aria: 
 Aria: 
 Chorale: 

The opening chorus is elaborate, focused on the theme that the Christian is to be a witness of Jesus, as John the Baptist was, with all his being. The movement begins with an expanded instrumental concerto in which a trumpet fanfare is responded to by the strings. The ritornello is played with interwoven vocal parts and finally repeated as in the beginning.

The first of four arias is for alto, possibly accompanied by an obbligato viola. Movement 3 is an aria for tenor and continuo. Movement 4 is an aria for soprano with an obbligato solo violin.

Movement 5, a bass aria, alludes again to the Baptist who in turn referred to Isaiah. The voice is accompanied by an obbligato trumpet and strings, reminiscent of the opening movement.

The final movement is a chorale of which Franck submitted only two lines. The continuation was found in a contemporary hymnal.

When Bach expanded the cantata, he probably used the same opening movement, the first aria as movement 3, the second as movement 7, the third as movement 5, and the fourth with a new text as movement 9. The closing chorale was not used in the later work.

References

External links 
  Herz und Mund und Tat und Leben BWV 147a; BC A 7 / Sacred cantata (4th Sunday of Advent), Leipzig University
 Berlin, Staatsbibliothek zu Berlin – Preußischer Kulturbesitz / D-B Mus. ms. Bach P 102 (autograph of BWV 147), Bach-Digital
 Reconstruction of the original Cantata by Dick Wursten
 BWV 147a Herz und Mund und Tat und Leben, University of Alberta

Church cantatas by Johann Sebastian Bach
1716 compositions
Advent music